is a series of Japan-exclusive horse racing video games developed and published by Hect.

This series of games allows players to simulate the life of a thoroughbred horse breeder and allows players to become very wealthy; if certain conditions are met in the game. Betting in addition to watching are the two modes usually permitted with games in this series.

A part of playing these games also involving feeding the animals, giving them water, buying them at low prices, and selling them when they reach peak prices at the market.

Games

The following is a list of games released in the series. Three games were released for the Super Famicom while two others were released for the first-generation PlayStation. The music of the games were composed by Tsukasa Tawada.

1993 video games
Hect games
Horse racing video games
Japan-exclusive video games
PlayStation (console) games
PlayStation (console)-only games
Racing video games
Super Nintendo Entertainment System games
Super Nintendo Entertainment System-only games
Video game franchises introduced in 1993
Video games developed in Japan
Video games set in Japan